The National Service Act 1964 (Cth) is a repealed amendment of the Parliament of the Commonwealth of Australia, passed on 24 November 1964. It amended the National Service Act 1951 to require 20-year-old males to serve in the Army for a period of twenty-four months of continuous service (reduced to eighteen months in 1971) followed by three years in the Reserve.

The Defence Act 1965 amended the Defence Act 1903 in May 1965 to provide that conscripts could be obliged to serve overseas, and in March 1966 Prime Minister Harold Holt announced that National Servicemen would be sent to Vietnam to fight in units of the Australian Regular Army.

Background 
On 5 November 1964, Cabinet decided to introduce a compulsory selective National Service scheme. In announcing this decision to Parliament, Prime Minister Robert Menzies referred to 'aggressive Communism', developments in Asia such as 'recent Indonesian policies and actions' and a 'deterioration in our strategic position' as being influential in the decision being reached (see Parliamentary Debates, House of Representatives, 25th Parliament, 1st Session, pp. 2517–2724). The Government had concluded that Australia had inadequate defence manpower and aimed to increase the strength of the Army to 33,000 by the end of 1966 by introducing national service.

Provisions 
Sections 5-9 deal with the amendments to registration. Sections 10-14 and 16 deal with the liability to serve, with sections 15 and 17-18 accommodate the conscript's civilian employment.

Analysis

Reaction 
The then serving Leader of the Opposition and Leader of the Australian Labor Party, Arthur Calwell, called the scheme the 'lottery of death'.

Legacy 
Between 1965 and December 1972, over 800,000 men registered for National Service, with some 63,000 conscripted and over 19,000 served in Vietnam. Although registration was compulsory, a biannual process of selection by ballot determined who would be called up. The ballots selected several dates in the selected period and all males with corresponding birthdays were called up for national service. The ballot was conducted using a lottery barrel and marbles representing birthdays.

Conscription ended as one of the first acts of the newly elected Labor Whitlam Government in December 1972.

See also

 Conscription in Australia

Further reading 

 Scates, Bob (10 October 2022).  "Draftmen go free : a history of the anti-Conscription Movement in Australia"  Book review and excerpt. The Commons Social Change Library. Retrieved 5 November 2022.

References

Citations

Notes 

Acts of the Parliament of Australia
Conscription in Australia
1964 in Australian law
Conscription law